Marilyn Mosby (née James; born January 22, 1980) is an American politician and lawyer who served as the State's Attorney for Baltimore from 2015 to 2023. She is currently under federal indictment for multiple crimes.

Early life
Born Marilyn James in Massachusetts, she was raised in Dorchester, Boston, by her grandparents. Her mother, Linda Thompson, was 17 when Mosby was born. Her mother and father both became police officers; her family traces its association with the police for two generations, as her grandfather was one of the first African-American police officers in the state. She attended Dover-Sherborn High School, an hour away from her home, as a result of METCO, the longest-standing school desegregation program in the country. She served in the Student Government Association, and was co-editor of the school newspaper.

Her interest in practicing law was sparked by the murder of her 17-year-old cousin by another 17-year-old outside of her home. Her cousin was mistakenly identified as a drug dealer and consequently murdered.

In 2000, when she was a 20-year-old Tuskegee University student, James appeared on the Judge Judy television show as a plaintiff, suing a roommate for damaging her property during summer break. She prevailed in the arbitration, and was awarded $1,700. She graduated magna cum laude from Tuskegee University with a (B.A.) degree; she earned a Juris Doctor from Boston College Law School in 2005.

Career
Mosby served as a law clerk and as Assistant State's Attorney for Baltimore from 2005 to 2011. Before that she had held a series of legal internships in Boston while in law school.

State's Attorney for Baltimore City
In 2013, Mosby announced plans to run for State's Attorney for the city of Baltimore. She ran against incumbent Gregg L. Bernstein in the Democratic primary, defeating him with 55 percent of the vote. She faced no Republican opposition in the general election.

Mosby won the general election, receiving 94 percent of the vote, defeating Independent Russell A. Neverdon Sr., who staged a write-in campaign. At the time of her election, Mosby was the youngest top prosecutor in a major US city.

Mosby was sworn into office on January 8, 2015. Soon after her first term in office had begun, Mosby announced restructuring of her office that was inspired by ideas from prosecutors' offices in New York, Los Angeles, and Atlanta. Deputy State's Attorney Janice Bledsoe was named to oversee the new division of "criminal intelligence". Mosby reestablished community liaison positions, which her predecessor had eliminated, to inform residents of developments in cases relevant to their neighborhood. She created the Policy and Legislative Affairs Unit to advocate for legislation to help keep residents safe and prosecute cases efficiently.

Mosby pushed unsuccessfully for bills that would have allowed prosecutors to introduce prior accusations against serial sex offenders during trial, an issue which she raised during her campaign. In May 2015, she secured the conviction of Nelson Clifford, a sex-offender who was acquitted in four previous sexual assault cases involving a "consent" defense. After the verdict she stated, "While we were able to secure a guilty verdict in this case, we must still encourage our legislators in Annapolis to bring our predatory sexual assault laws in line with the federal statute. Clifford was sentenced to more than 30 years in prison."

In January 2019, she announced that her office would no longer prosecute individuals for marijuana possession (regardless of quantity). She added that she would vacate nearly 5,000 marijuana possession convictions. In 2020, amid the COVID-19 pandemic, she announced that her office were no longer prosecuting drug possession, prostitution, minor traffic violations and other low-level offenses in order to halt the spread of the coronavirus in Baltimore prisons. In March 2021, she said she would make that permanent, as she said that the temporary experiment had not led to more serious crimes.

Mosby announced on April 12, 2022 that she would run for re-election to a third term. She was defeated in the Democratic primary on July 19, 2022, by defense attorney Ivan Bates.

Violent criminal prosecutions
Mosby campaigned on a promise to target and prosecute violent repeat offenders. Since her administration began in January 2015, she has overseen successful prosecutions of a number of locally highlighted offenders, such as Darryl Anderson, Capone Chase, Nelson Clifford, Mustafa Eraibi, and Cornell Harvey.

She created the Criminal Strategies Unit, modeled after a similar unit in the Manhattan District Attorney's Office, to use community assistance to identify and target violent repeat offenders. The Unit utilizes technology, data-analysis, and intelligence-gathering in combination with close relationships with community organizations to identify trends in crime and works with law enforcement to target those who perpetuate these trends.

In response to a 2015 spike in violent crime in Baltimore, Mosby and newly appointed interim Police Commissioner Kevin Davis announced that prosecutors and police officers would co-locate inside of a 24-hour "war room" in which law enforcement would target violent repeat offenders around the clock.

Freddie Gray case

In 2015, Mosby charged six police officers, who had arrested detainee Freddie Gray prior to his death caused by injuries sustained in police custody, with a variety of crimes including second-degree murder and involuntary manslaughter. David Jaros, an associate professor at the University of Baltimore School of Law, was reported as saying that Mosby quite possibly overcharged the officers, while noting this is absolutely typical in criminal cases involving defendants who are not police.

Anonymous police department sources were reported by CNN as saying the Baltimore police's investigation did not support some of the charges brought against the officers. According to CNN,

Mosby has good reason to separate her probe from the police. There is widespread community distrust of the police. And many critics say letting police departments investigate themselves is partly why alleged excessive use of force incidents by officers rarely draw serious punishment.

Mosby defended the charges in a statement released through a spokesperson, and condemned the release of information as unethical.

In a May 4, 2015, interview on Fox News, Harvard Law Professor Alan Dershowitz said that he believes Mosby overcharged the officers in an attempt to satisfy protesters and prevent further disturbances. Former Baltimore Prosecutor Page Croyder wrote an op-ed in The Baltimore Sun in which she described Mosby's charges as reflecting "either incompetence or an unethical recklessness". Croyder said that Mosby circumvented normal procedures "to step into the national limelight", and that she "pandered to the public", creating an expectation of a conviction.

On May 21, a grand jury indicted the officers on most of the original charges filed by Mosby, with the exception of the charges of illegal imprisonment and false arrest, and added charges of reckless endangerment to all the officers involved. In May 2015, Mosby appeared onstage at concert with the musician Prince, after which she was criticized for using the Freddie Gray incident for personal and political gain. The Baltimore Sun reported that Mosby received $12,000 in free travel to speak at events around the nation after the officers were charged.

When asked to respond to the allegation from police that she does not support the police, Mosby called the notion 'absurd', citing her family's history of working in law enforcement. Mosby was criticized for requesting the increased police presence, in the same neighborhood where Gray was arrested, just weeks prior to the incident.

William Porter was the first officer tried; this resulted in a hung jury, and the judge declared a mistrial in December 2015. The Baltimore Sun reported that Porter was within one vote of an acquittal on the most serious charge against him.

The second trial of officers ended on May 11, 2016, when Officer Edward Nero was acquitted on all charges. His acquittal resulted in increased criticism of Mosby for having moved too quickly in charging the officers.

The third trial ended on June 23, 2016, and Officer Goodson was acquitted on all counts. George Washington University Law School professor John F. Banzhaf III filed a complaint with the Maryland's Attorney Grievance Commission against Mosby, saying she did not have probable cause to charge six officers in the killing of Freddie Gray, and also that she repeatedly withheld evidence from the officers' defense attorneys.

Five of the six police officers charged by Mosby are suing her for malicious prosecution, defamation, and invasion of privacy.

Community outreach
Mosby started initiatives to engage the Baltimore community, including:
 Aim to B'More – Begun in the spring of 2015 to provide an alternative to incarceration and a criminal record for first-time, non-violent felony drug offenders. Eligible defendants are granted probation before judgment, and placed on three years of probation. During probation, defendants complete 150 hours of community service, job skills training, and GED testing and/or substance abuse treatment as needed. The Office of the State's Attorney partnered with local employers to secure full-time jobs for program participants following completion of their job skills training. If successful, after three years participants can apply to expunge their records.
 Junior State's Attorney – Launched in the summer of 2015, the program introduces up to 30 promising middle school students each summer to careers in the criminal justice field.
 Community Day in Court – In an effort to rebuild trust and faith in the criminal justice system, Mosby began holding quarterly Community Days in Court, bringing the public and law enforcement quarterly together to discuss issues plaguing the city.

Controversy and allegations of law violations
Besides criticism of her case against the officers charged in Gray's death, Mosby has faced questions for her frequent speaking engagements and private businesses. Though she maintained she did nothing wrong, Mosby asked city Inspector General Isabel Mercedes Cumming to investigate. Cumming found Mosby was out of town for 144 workdays in 2018 and 2019, did not report 15 out-of-town trips to the Board of Estimates and used LLCs she claimed to be dormant as tax write-offs. City Solicitor Jim Shea issued his own assessment, finding that administrative rules are unclear and that Mosby did nothing wrong in regards to her travel.

Days later, it was revealed that lawyers who responded to the inspector general's report on Mosby's behalf were paid by Mosby's campaign, a possible violation of state law.

As of March 2021, Mosby and her husband are the subjects of an active federal investigation. Investigators have sought a wide range of business and campaign records.

Florida land records revealed Mosby bought two homes in Florida weeks before the federal investigation came to light.

In October 2020, a $45,000 tax lien was filed against the property of Marilyn and Nick Mosby for three years of unpaid federal taxes (2014, 2015, and 2016). Nick Mosby said he has been "in ongoing conversations with the IRS" about resolving this issue. That November, he said the issue was "settled".

Complaint against media
In May 2021, Mosby's office filed a complaint with the Federal Communications Commission (FCC) against Baltimore television station WBFF, which had been critical of Mosby, alleging the station's coverage of her office was "blatantly slanted, dishonest, misleading, racist, and extremely dangerous". The complaint also stated that "We welcome being held accountable, and we support First Amendment freedom of speech." WBFF responded that its journalism was in the public interest, and "While we understand that it's not always popular with the individuals and institutions upon which we are shining a light, we stand by our reporting."

FCC commissioner Brendan Carr characterized Mosby's complaint as, "a chilling and direct attack on free speech and journalistic freedom".

Personal life
In 2005 James married Nick Mosby, a Maryland State Delegate. They have two daughters. They live in the Reservoir Hill neighborhood of Baltimore. She has used Mosby as her name professionally since then.

Federal indictment
On January 13, 2022, Mosby was indicted by a federal grand jury on a perjury charge alleging she falsely claimed COVID-19-related financial hardship in requesting one-time withdrawals of $40,000 and $50,000 of her deferred compensation funds under the CARES Act, which describes specific criteria for qualifying withdrawals, such as a reduction of income due to a COVID-related layoff or due to quarantining, whereas she reportedly had continued to draw her full salary throughout the period, and her salary had actually increased. She additionally was accused of making false statements in mortgage applications for her Florida home and condo by failing to disclose her federal tax liabilities. There are four counts in the indictment. 

On February 4, 2022, Mosby pleaded not guilty to the charges. Her trial was scheduled to begin in March of 2023, but in January, her defense attorneys were permitted to withdraw from the case after being accused of violating court rules, which resulted in further delay.  She has been declared indigent, and a public defender has been assigned to represent her.

References

Citations

External links
 Marilyn Mosby on The Baltimore City State's Attorney's Office's official website

1980 births
Living people
Lawyers from Boston
Lawyers from Baltimore
People from Dorchester, Massachusetts
American women lawyers
African-American women lawyers
African-American lawyers
Maryland Democrats
State's attorneys in Maryland
Death of Freddie Gray
Boston College Law School alumni
Tuskegee University alumni
20th-century African-American people
20th-century African-American women
20th-century American women lawyers
20th-century American lawyers
21st-century African-American women
21st-century American women lawyers
21st-century American lawyers
21st-century African-American politicians
21st-century American politicians